The Young Lions is an album by an ad hoc group of  jazz musicians: Wayne Shorter, Frank Strozier, Lee Morgan, Bobby Timmons, Bob Cranshaw, Albert Heath and Louis Hayes. It was recorded at Bell Sound Studios in New York City in 1960 and released in 1961 on Vee-Jay Records.

Album title 
The album title echoes that of a popular 1948 novel by Irwin Shaw which had been made into a feature film shortly before the album was recorded. In the album's liner notes, saxophonist Cannonball Adderley uses Shaw's novel to make an argument about jazz. Adderley writes that there is a tension in modern jazz between tradition (as represented by Charlie Parker, Dizzy Gillespie, and Thelonious Monk) and the avant-garde (which at the time included Ornette Coleman, Cecil Taylor and Jimmy Giuffre), and suggests that conformity to either traditionalism or the avant-garde is stifling of "true genius":

The "young lions" phrase was revived in jazz in the 1980s when, as in 1960, there was a tension between the modern jazz traditionalists and the avant-garde. A  group of young musicians including Wynton Marsalis who played neo-bop jazz were frequently referred to in the jazz press as "young lions". Notably, the phrase was used as part of the title of an Elektra/Musician album which featured Marsalis, The Young Lions (A Concert Of New Music Played By Seventeen Exceptional Young Musicians).

Track listing 
"Seeds of Sin" (Shorter) – 5:44
"Scourn'" (Shorter) – 5:58
"Fat Lady" (Shorter) – 5:03
"Peaches and Cream" (Shorter) – 6:52
"That's Right" (Morgan) – 11:37

Bonus tracks on CD reissue:

"Seeds of Sin" [Alternate take] – 5:43
"Scourn [Alternate take] – 6:17
"Fat Lady" [Alternate take] – 5:23

Personnel 
Lee Morgan – trumpet
Wayne Shorter – tenor sax
Frank Strozier – alto sax
Bobby Timmons – piano
Bob Cranshaw – bass
Louis Hayes (1, 2, 6, 7), Albert "Tootie" Heath (3–5, 8) – drums

References 

1961 debut albums
Vee-Jay Records albums